Konstantinos Barbarousis (Greek: Κωνσταντίνος Μπαρμπαρούσης; Machairas, Astakos, 30 October 1980) is a far-right Greek politician, member of the Greek Parliament for Golden Dawn from May 2012 until June 2019. 

In 2018, from the floor of the parliament, Barbarousis called for the military to "respect their oath" and arrest Prime Minister Alexis Tsipras, Minister of National Defence Panos Kammenos, and President Prokopis Pavlopoulos "in order to prevent this high treason" about the Prespa agreement that was due to be reached, that was seen as giving out the name "Macedonia". The government of the time reacted to it as a call for a military coup, and a treason investigation was opened against him. 

After his speech, Barbousis was expelled from the party and from parliament. 

At the time of his speech, massive peaceful protests had already happened in and out of the country against the Prespa agreement (also by Greek communities residing outside of Greece) and in instances in Greece there was conflict between protesters and anti-riot units, as they got closer to the parliament. In a video, there were children and generally families, and it appears and it's alleged that protesters were not violent, but still received tear gassing and beatings by anti-riot orders. Also, in the same cases, it has been said that the anti-riot units were foreign, perhaps to not have personal connection to the protests they were ordered to fight.

References

External links
 

Year of birth missing (living people)
Living people
Golden Dawn (political party) politicians
Greek MPs 2012–2014
Greek MPs 2015 (February–August)
Greek MPs 2015–2019
People from Astakos